Dezmon Jerrod Briscoe (born August 31, 1989) is a former American football wide receiver. He was drafted by the Cincinnati Bengals in the sixth round of the 2010 NFL Draft. He played college football at the University of Kansas.

Early years
Briscoe was born in Dallas, Texas. He attended Cedar Hill High School in Cedar Hill, Texas, where he played for the Cedar Hill Longhorns high school football team. He played varsity for two seasons. As a senior in 2006, he recorded 37 receptions for 708 yards and 11 touchdowns as part of a state championship team. This was the very first Cedar Hill state championship team.

Considered a three-star recruit by 247Sports.com, Briscoe was listed as the No. 126 wide receiver in the nation in 2007.

College career
He enrolled at the University of Kansas where he majored in physical education. Briscoe saw action as a true freshman in Kansas in all 13 games including 11 starts. He recorded 43 receptions for 496 yards and seven touchdowns. Briscoe set the school record for a freshman for number of touchdown receptions. The Sporting News named him an honorable mention freshman All-American.

In 2008, he recorded 92 receptions for 1,407 yards and 15 touchdowns. His marks for both receiving yards and touchdowns set new school records. Against Oklahoma, he set a school record for single-game yards with 269 and the most by any individual in the NCAA during the 2008 season. Briscoe also set school records with seven 100-yard games in a season, four consecutive 100-yard games, and 22 career touchdowns. In the regular season finale against Missouri, Briscoe saw his first action as a kickoff returner and recorded seven returns for 195 yards. In the 2008 Insight Bowl against Minnesota, Briscoe caught 14 receptions, which tied the school record for a single game, and returned one kickoff 24 yards. He was named the game's most valuable offensive player. Sports Illustrated named him an honorable mention All-American. Briscoe was also named to the All-Big 12 Conference second-team.

In his junior season, he had 84 receptions for 1,337 yards and 9 touchdowns and was named to the All-Big 12 Conference first-team.  After the season, Briscoe chose to enter the NFL draft.

Briscoe ended his three-year college career as the Kansas all-time leader in receiving yards.  His career totals are 208 receptions for 3,240 yards and 31 touchdowns.

Professional career

Cincinnati Bengals
Briscoe was drafted by the Cincinnati Bengals in the sixth round with the 191st overall pick in the 2010 NFL Draft. He signed a four-year deal with the team on June 25, 2010. Briscoe was then waived on September 4 during final cuts.

Tampa Bay Buccaneers
On September 5, 2010, Briscoe signed with the Tampa Bay Buccaneers. On November 30, 2010, he was promoted to the active roster from the practice squad. He made his first career touchdown reception in Week 17 of the 2010 season against the New Orleans Saints.

Briscoe played all 16 games, starting two of them, in the 2011 season and recorded 35 receptions for 387 yards and six touchdowns.

He was released on waivers July 26, 2012.

Washington Redskins
Briscoe was claimed off waivers on July 27, 2012 by the Washington Redskins. On August 31, 2013, the Redskins waived/injured him after he suffered a left shoulder injury in the last 2013 preseason game against the Tampa Bay Buccaneers, Two days later he was placed on the team's injured reserve list.

Dallas Cowboys
Briscoe was signed by the Dallas Cowboys on July 21, 2014. He was released on August 30 during final roster cuts before the start of the 2014 season.

References

External links

 
 Kansas Jayhawks bio
 Washington Redskins bio
 NFL Combine profile

1989 births
Living people
American football wide receivers
Cincinnati Bengals players
Dallas Cowboys players
Kansas Jayhawks football players
Players of American football from Dallas
Tampa Bay Buccaneers players
Washington Redskins players